Proeumicrotrmus is a monospecific genus of marine ray-finned fish belonging to the family Cyclopteridae, the lumpfishes or lumpsuckers. The only species in the genus is Proeumicrotremus soldatovi, Soldatov's lumpsucker. This species is found in the Northwest Pacific. It reaches  in total length, making it larger than average for a lumpfish. It was previously considered a species of Eumicrotremus until a morphology-based revision in 2020 concluded that it represents the only known species of a distinct genus.

References 

Fish of the North Pacific
Fish described in 1930
Cyclopteridae